Maiden Japan, released as Heavy Metal Army in Japan, is a live EP by the British heavy metal band Iron Maiden. The title is a pun of Deep Purple's live album Made in Japan.

Release 
There are at least two different versions of this EP; all tracks were recorded at the Aichi Kosei Nenkin Kaikan in Chikusa-ku, Nagoya, Aichi, Japan on 23 May 1981.  It was lead singer Paul Di'Anno's final recording with the band.  The original Japanese pressing features only 4 tracks and the record speed is 45RPM, but the other version has 5 tracks. It was never the band's intention to release this album, but Toshiba-EMI wanted a live album.

Cover art 
The original cover depicted the band's mascot, Eddie, holding the severed head of singer Paul Di'Anno. The replacement cover was done on very short notice after Iron Maiden's manager, Rod Smallwood, received a proof for review, and became agitated at Di'Anno's depiction because the band were looking to replace him. Maiden Japan was released in Venezuela in 1987 with the original cover and has become a collector's item.

Accolades
The Rolling Stone Italia named Maiden Japan EP as "The most important and the best metal's live EPs ever". Ultimate Classic Rock placed Maiden Japan on Top 40 Best 1981 Albums List. Maiden Japan EP went platinum in Canada and made it to the charts in many other countries around the world. In 1990, it was reissued for the last time as part of 20 maxi-singles collection spanning band's all official releases of 1980 - 1990 decade.

Track listing 
Production and performance credits are adapted from the EP liner notes.

European and Japanese edition

International edition

Personnel 
 Paul Di'Anno – lead vocals
 Dave Murray – guitar
 Adrian Smith – guitar, backing vocals
 Steve Harris – bass, backing vocals
 Clive Burr – drums

Production 

 Doug Hall – producer, engineer
 Hiro Ohno – photography
Rod Smallwood – management, photography

Chart performance

Certifications

Notes

References 

1981 EPs
Live EPs
Iron Maiden live albums
Iron Maiden EPs
1981 live albums
Live heavy metal albums